Libya national under-20 football team (Arabic:منتخب ليبيا الوطني لكرة القدم تحت 20 سنة), represents Libya in association football at an under-20 age level and is controlled by the Libyan Football Federation, the governing body for football in Libya.

Achievements
UNAF U-20 Tournament
Champions (1): 2011
Third Place (2): 2007, 2014
Arab Cup U-20
Third place: 2012

Tournament Records

FIFA U-20 World Cup record

Africa U-20 Cup of Nations record

UNAF U-20 Tournament record

Mediterranean Games Record

Prior to the Athens 1991 campaign, the Football at the Mediterranean Games was open to full senior national teams.

Arab Cup U-20 Record

References

External links
Team profile - Grenada FA website

under-20
African national under-20 association football teams